Rıdvan Şimşek (born 17 January 1991) is a Turkish professional footballer who plays as a right wingback for İzmirspor.

Career

Early years
Named by his father, inspired by Rıdvan Dilmen, a prominent striker in Turkish football history, Şimşek began his career with Karşıyaka at the age of 12. He made his professional debut at the age of 17 in a TFF First League match against Kasımpaşa S.K. on September 2008, and became a regular member of the team.

Beşiktaş
Şimşek joined Beşiktaş in June 2009 for 1.25 million TRY. He played seven games for them in the Süper Lig. He was loaned to Karabükspor and Elazığspor in the 2011-12 season.

Gaziantepspor
He was transferred to Gaziantepspor in summer 2012.

Back to Karşıyaka
He returned to Karşıyaka in summer 2013.

References

External links
 
 
 Şimşek Interview by yesilkirmizi.net 
 

1991 births
Living people
Footballers from İzmir
Turkish footballers
Turkey under-21 international footballers
Turkey youth international footballers
Turkey B international footballers
Süper Lig players
TFF First League players
Karşıyaka S.K. footballers
Beşiktaş J.K. footballers
Kardemir Karabükspor footballers
Elazığspor footballers
Antalyaspor footballers
Sivasspor footballers
Gaziantep F.K. footballers
Ankara Keçiörengücü S.K. footballers
İstanbulspor footballers
Altay S.K. footballers
Association football fullbacks